Saint-Omer is a municipality in L'Islet Regional County Municipality in the Chaudière-Appalaches region of Quebec, Canada.

See also
 List of municipalities in Quebec

References

External links
 

Municipalities in Quebec
Incorporated places in Chaudière-Appalaches